This is the list of notable stars in the constellation Centaurus, sorted by decreasing brightness.

See also
List of stars by constellation

Notes

References

 List
Centaurus